The third season of Australian reality television series Lego Masters premiered on the Nine Network on 19 April 2021. Hamish Blake returned as host along with Ryan "The Brickman" McNaught as judge.

Production

Auditions for the third season opened in May 2020 asking for applicants 15 years old and above. In early September 2020, it was confirmed the third season would begin filming on Monday, October 5 at Melbourne Showgrounds. On 16 September 2020, the third season was officially confirmed at Nine's 2021 upfronts.

Teams

Notes
* Not all teams in the season have a relation (i.e. family or friend), some were paired together during the application process due to single applications.

Elimination history

Series Details

Challenge 1
Airdate - 19 April 2021
Challenge: "Stop In Your Tracks" - Each of the eight teams were tasked with creating a design of their choice in 17 hours that would cause a train to stop.
Advantage - The winner of the challenge received "The Platinum Brick", which they can use at the end of an Elimination Challenge to receive immunity.
The Brick of Doom - A brand new invention this season. Drawing the Brick of Doom means your team will be cursed and punished with a 5-minute delay in starting the builds. The curse can be broken by winning a challenge.

Challenge 2

Airdate - 20 April 2021
Challenge: "Castles and Cannonballs" - The teams had 8 hours to build a castle from a historical time period selected at random. Once finished, they were placed at the end of a bowling lane and smashed by a ball bowled by Hamish. The winner of the challenge received immunity from the next Elimination Challenge - no elimination in this challenge.

Challenge 3

Airdate - 21 April 2021
Challenge: "Snow Globe" - Each team had 10 hours to create a design of their choice that would look beautiful inside a snow globe which had to factor in how the snow would move around the globe and add to their story. The team with the weakest design was eliminated.

Challenge 4

Airdate - 25 April 2021
Advantage Challenge: "Fantastical Beasts" - Teams were given six hours to build a creature with characteristics of two animals decided by what animals they landed on two separate chocolate wheels. The winner of the challenge received an advantage of an extra 30 minutes for the elimination challenge.
Elimination Challenge: "Mission to Mars" - The teams were given eight hours to make a creation on a shelf for a spaceship, choosing what mankind would send to Mars. The team with the weakest design was eliminated.

Challenge 5

Airdate - 26 April 2021
Challenge: "Hero's Quest" - The teams had 12 hours to build an adventure from a map section selected by 'first in best dressed'. The winner of the challenge received immunity from the next Elimination Challenge.

Challenge 6

Airdate - 27 April 2021
Challenge: "Cut in Half" - Each team had 10 hours to make a creation that builds on the other half of an object already cut in half. The team with the weakest design link was eliminated.

Challenge 7 

Airdate - 2 May 2021
Advantage Challenge: "Will They Fly?" - Teams were given five hours to build a creation that when suspended from a helium-filled weather balloon would remain neutrally buoyant (floating) for a count of 10 seconds. The winner of the challenge received an advantage of an extra 30 minutes for the elimination challenge.
Elimination Challenge: "Kale Scale" - The teams were given eight hours to make a creation as tall as Kale Frost from Lego Master Australia Season 1, but an extra restriction was that the creation could not be a building or a tower. The team with the weakest story elements and aesthetics in the build was eliminated.

Challenge 8

Airdate - 3 May 2021
Challenge: "Four Seasons" - Four eliminated teams return for a second chance challenge. The teams were given ten hours to create one of the four seasons at minifig scale on a giant baseplate. The two teams with the best storyline, use of technical skills and aesthetics were returned to the competition.

Challenge 9

Airdate - 4 May 2021
Challenge: "Arcade Game" - The teams had 12 hours to build an original arcade game based on a blind minifig pick. The winner of the challenge received immunity from the next Elimination Challenge.

Challenge 10

Airdate - 9 May 2021
Advantage Challenge: "Race" - Teams were given four hours to build a vehicle without using wheels and tyres that can race down a purpose-built track in the shortest time after several heats. The winner of the challenge received an advantage of an extra 1 hour for the next Elimination Challenge. Season 2's Trent Cucchiarelli came to provide commentary.
Elimination Challenge: "Dream Home" - Teams were given 11 hours to build their ultimate dream house with a nightmare twist added with three hours left in the build. The team with the weakest design was eliminated.

Challenge 11 
Airdate - 10 May 2021
Challenge: "Heroic Moment of Impact" - Teams were given 10 hours to create an action scene from the Marvel Cinematic Universe. Teams have to show motion and energy without actual movement from motors or technic. Teams chose a minifig that gave a location for their diorama. Teams were given access to a secret Brick Pit and collection of Mini Fig characters for a build that needs to show a heroic moment of impact from the Marvel Cinematic Universe. The winner of the challenge was given immunity for the next Elimination Challenge.

Challenge 12 
Airdate - 11 May 2021
Challenge: "House of Colour" - Teams were provided with a pre-built, identical, greyscale house which they had to bring to life with colour during a 12-hour build. The team with the least impressive story and aesthetics were eliminated.

Challenge 13 
Airdate - 16 May 2021
Challenge: "Out on a Limb" - the four remaining teams were given 10 hours to dress an empty tree branch that was connected to a life-size LEGO tree. After the initial build, the base of the tree was opened to reveal an underground area. Teams were given 5 hours to add an underground element to their build as well as modify the branch build to suit. The team with the least impressive build were eliminated.

Grand Finale 
Airdate - 17 May 2021
Grand Finale Challenge - Over 28 hours, the remaining three teams are tasked with building something of their own choice; yet still needing to adhere to the criteria of technical skills, story-telling elements and overall aesthetic. The Team with the most votes would be crowned LEGO Masters champions and claim the $100,000 prize.
Voting & Judgment - The 250 members of the public judged the builds, assigning their Blue Bricks (worth 1 vote) to whichever model they liked most. Completing the vote, Brickman was given a Golden Brick worth 100 votes.

Ratings

References

2021 Australian television seasons